Kadambari Kadam is an Indian actress who also works in television serials. She is known for her role in Avaghachi Sansar as Antara & Teen Bahuraaniyaan as Janki Desai. In 2011, She was playing the lead role in Tujvin Sakhya Re as Radhika. She currently stars in the Marathi Play Charchaughi.

Early life and career
She was born on 13 October 1988 into a Maharashtrian family in Mumbai. Kadambari married cinematographer and director Avinash Arun on 10 November 2016. They had their first child, a son, on 2 May 2018 whom they named Kartik.

Her first stage appearance was at the age of 3. She completed her Schooling at Goregaon Vidyamandir, Mumbai. She always had a dream to be an actor. She has done serials like Kehta Hai Dil, Kabhi Sautan Kabhi Saheli, Teen Bahuraaniyaan and many more. Kadambari is known for her excellent comic timing.

Filmography

Films

Television

Theatre

References

External links 
 

Actresses in Marathi cinema
Actresses from Pune
1988 births
Living people